Linda Olsson (born 1948) is a Swedish-born novelist who lives in Auckland, New Zealand. Published in 2005, her first novel Let me sing you gentle songs, an international best seller, has been translated into 15 languages. She writes in both English and Swedish.

Biography
Born in Stockholm in 1948, Olsson was raised there by working-class parents. After graduating in law from the University of Stockholm, she worked in banking and finance, married and gave birth to three sons. In 1986, they left Sweden for Kenya where Olsson initially intended to take up a post in Kenya. But she travelled on to Singapore, Britain and Japan, finally settling in New Zealand with her family in 1990. She continued her studies at the University of Wellington, graduating in English and German literature.

Olsson had first followed a course in creative writing in London which encouraged her to write short stories. After arriving in New Zealand, she won a short story competition run by the Sunday Star Times in 2003. She is a graduate of the Master of Creative Writing programme at the University of Auckland, studying with Witi Ihimaera.

In 2005 she completed her first novel Let Me Sing You Gentle Songs (later reprinted as Astrid and Veronika in 2007) which was published in 25 countries. In Sweden, it became a winning best seller. Her subsequent novels: Sonata for Miriam (2009), The Kindness of Your Nature (2011), and The Blackbird Sings at Dusk (2016) have also been international successes. She completed her fifth novel, A Sister in My House, in April 2016.

Under the pen name Adam Sarafis, she has also collaborated with Thomas Sainsbury on the thriller Something is Rotten (2015).

Publications
Olsson, Linda. Let Me Sing You Gentle Songs. 2005. Penguin Books NZ. Republished as Astrid and Veronika. Penguin Books 2007. 
Olsson, Linda. Sonata for Miriam: A Novel. 2009. Penguin Books. 
Olsson, Linda. The Kindness of Your Nature. 2011. Penguin Books. . Republished as The Memory of Love. Penguin Books 2011. 
Olsson, Linda. The Blackbird Sings at Dusk. 2016. Penguin Books.

References

External links
Linda Olsson's website

1948 births
Writers from Stockholm
Swedish women novelists
New Zealand women novelists
Living people
20th-century New Zealand novelists
20th-century Swedish novelists
20th-century Swedish women writers
Stockholm University alumni
Victoria University of Wellington alumni